Bayswater is a suburb of Perth, Western Australia which was established in the 1880s. This article is a list of streets in Bayswater, along with the origin of their names. Some common street name origins in Bayswater are places in the United Kingdom, particularly England, early residents of Bayswater, soldiers in World War I, and former councillors.

List of streets in Bayswater

Streets starting with A or B

Streets starting with C or D

Streets starting with E, F or G

Streets starting with H, I or J

Streets starting with K, L or M

Streets starting with N, O or P

Streets starting with Q or R

Streets starting with S, T, U or V

Streets starting with W, X or Y

See also
List of streets in Perth
List of streets in East Perth
List of streets in West Perth
List of streets in Crawley and Nedlands
List of streets and paths in Kings Park
List of streets in Kardinya, Western Australia

References

Streets
Bayswater
Bayswater, Western Australia
Bayswater streets